Balje may refer to:

People
 Duda Balje (born 1977), Kosovan politician
 Hamza Balje (born 1970), Kosovan politician

Places
 Balje, Lower Saxony, Germany
 Blaue Balje, Germany
 Otzumer Balje, Germany